Zidane Aamar Iqbal (born 27 April 2003) is a professional footballer who plays as a midfielder for  club Manchester United. Born in England, he represents the Iraq national team.

Born in Manchester, Iqbal joined the Manchester United youth system aged nine. He made his first-team debut in a UEFA Champions League match in December 2021. Iqbal represented Iraq at under-23 level before making his senior international debut in January 2022.

Early life
Born in Manchester to a Pakistani father and an Iraqi mother, Iqbal played for local side Sale United from the age of four before joining Manchester United at the age of nine.

Club career
Iqbal signed his first professional contract with Manchester United in April 2021. He made his first-team debut for Manchester United on 8 December 2021 as an 89th-minute substitute in a Champions League match against Young Boys. Thus, he became the first British-born South Asian to play for the club, and the first ever British South Asian to play in the Champions League.

International career
Iqbal is eligible to represent England, Iraq and Pakistan at international level.

In May 2021, he received an Iraqi passport, and has represented Iraq at youth international level. In June 2021, he was called up to the Iraq under-20 team for the 2021 Arab Cup U-20. However, he was refused to travel by Manchester United, due to the COVID-19 pandemic.

In September 2021, Iqbal received his first call up to the Iraq U23s for a training camp in the United Arab Emirates (UAE). He made his debut on 4 September against the UAE U23s, making the starting line-up. In October 2021, Iqbal was named as part of the 23-man Iraq U23 squad for the 2021 WAFF U-23 Championship in Saudi Arabia. On 8 October, Iqbal scored his first goal for the Iraq U23 team as the captain of his side.

In January 2022, Iqbal was called up to the Iraq national team for the 2022 World Cup qualifiers against Iran and Lebanon. He made his debut in a 1–0 loss to Iran on 27 January.

Style of play
Iqbal is a midfielder with lots of flair, and is fairly versatile. His main position is as a central midfielder however he has been deployed as a defensive midfielder and attacking midfielder before.

Personal life
As one of a small number of British Asians in association football, Iqbal was part of an FA content series to support South Asian Heritage Month in 2021.

Iqbal is Muslim and cites Mesut Özil as an inspiration for him.

Career statistics

Club

International

References

External links

 

2003 births
Living people
Footballers from Manchester
Iraqi footballers
Iraq youth international footballers
Iraq international footballers
English footballers
English people of Iraqi descent
English people of Pakistani descent
British Asian footballers
Iraqi people of Pakistani descent
Association football midfielders
Manchester United F.C. players